Fallin is a village in the Stirling council area of Scotland. It lies on the A905 road 3 miles east of Stirling on a bend in the River Forth. The United Kingdom Census 2001 recorded the population as 2,710.

It was formerly a pit village, the site of the Polmaise Colliery 3&4 (Polmaise Colliery 1&2 was situated at Milhall), originally opened in 1904 by Archibald Russell Ltd. At its peak, in 1957, it employed 778 people.  During the UK miners' strike 1984-85 it was reputed to be the only colliery in Britain where support was so strong that there was no need for pickets during the whole of the strike. British Coal decided to close the Colliery on 17 July 1987, marking the end of coal mining in Stirlingshire.

The village is home to The Goth, a community-run pub and one of the few remaining pubs in Scotland still run under the Gothenburg system.

Fallin has been the site of several new housing developments.

In 2022 Christmas lights will be erected for the first time - this is being created by the Fallin Community Voice and the PCC -through funding by residents of the village

Notes

External links

Canmore - Fallin, Polmaise Colliery site record
Scottish Places - Fallin

Villages in Stirling (council area)
Mining communities in Scotland